St. Ignace Island (French: Île Saint-Ignace), in northern Lake Superior in Ontario, Canada, is the eleventh-largest lake island in the world.

St. Ignace Island, which is uninhabited, is situated near the north shore of Lake Superior at the entrance to that lake's Nipigon Bay, in Northern Ontario. The English name is a translation of the original French name given it by Jesuit missionaries in honor of their founder St. Ignatius of Loyola. The island is clearly depicted on the 1669 map "Lac Tracy ou Superieur avec les dependances de la Mission du Saint Esprit" attributed to Claude-Jean Allouez and Jacques Marquette.

Nipigon Strait separates it from the large Black Bay peninsula. St. Ignace Island lies next to Simpson Island.

Climate
The island has a humid continental climate. St. Ignace Island has incredible seasonal lag due to maritime influences. August and September are the warmest months and February is the coldest month by a substantial margin.

References

Uninhabited islands of Ontario
Landforms of Thunder Bay District
Islands of Lake Superior in Ontario